Sour Mash is the second album by Australian blues rock band Beasts of Bourbon which was recorded in 1988 and originally released on the Red Eye label.

Reception

In the review on Allmusic, Skip Jansen states "With The Johnnys and Scientists both calling it a day just prior to Sour Mash, the collective creative forces were pooled to make the Beasts of Bourbon's landmark in which remains their prime document. A raw blues-rock album with post-punk afflictions ... With the enigmatic Tex Perkins, who could be one of rock & roll's last great frontmen, and the blistering slide-guitar-driven sound, the band does a fine job of re-creating the sound of a twisted night out at the pub".

Track listing 
All songs by Kim Salmon and Tex Perkins except where noted
 "Hard Work Drivin' Man" (Jack Nitzsche, Ry Cooder, Paul Schrader, Tex Perkins, Beasts of Bourbon) – 3:22
 "Hard for You" (Perkins, Beasts of Bourbon) – 3:30
 "Watch Your Step" – 2:00
 "Playground" (Salmon) – 3:58
 "Door to Your Soul" – 3:37
 "These Are the Good Old Days" (Spencer P. Jones, Salmon, Perkins) – 3:00
 "The Hate Inside" (Jones, Perkins) – 3:27
 "Pig" (Jones, Perkins) – 4:33
 "Driver Man" (Traditional) – 4:03
 "Today I Started Loving You Again" (Merle Haggard, Bonnie Owens) – 4:20
 "Flathead (The Fugitive)" (Salmon) – 2:00
 "This Ol' Shit" (Perkins) – 2:40
 "Sun Gods" (Perkins) – 3:18

Personnel 
Beasts of Bourbon
Tex Perkins – vocals, siren, guitar, drum
Spencer P. Jones – guitar, clock guitar
Kim Salmon – guitar, slide guitar, wild boar guitar, harmonica, tambourine, conductor
Boris Sudjovic – bass, tambourine, foot stomping, handclaps
James Baker – drums, cymbal, handclaps
with:
Adrian Hornblower – tuba, soprano saxophone, tenor saxophone, baritone saxophone (tracks 6, 8 & 9)

Production
Phil Punch – engineer
Phil Punch and The Beasts – producer

References 

Beasts of Bourbon albums
1988 albums
Red Eye Records (label) albums